John Edge may refer to:

John T. Edge
Sir John Edge, a Chief Justice in India during the British Raj era